Debbie Jones may refer to:

 Debbie Dingle, previously Debbie Jones, fictional character in Emmerdale
Debbie Jones, fictional character in the film Babel
Debbie Jones (athlete) (born 1958), Bermudian Olympic sprinter
Debbie Jones (civil rights activist) in Montgomery Improvement Association
Debbie Jones (curler) in 1985 H&M World Women's Curling Championship

See also
Deborah Jones (disambiguation)